The Middleweight (75 kg) competition at the 2016 AIBA Women's World Boxing Championships was held from 19 to 27 May 2016.

Draw

Preliminaries

Main draw

References
Draw

Middleweight